Cycling was contested at the 1998 Asian Games in Thailand from December 7 to December 19. Road bicycle racing was held at the Highway No 1 and No 2 from Saraburi Province to Nakhon Ratchasima Province, while track cycling was contested at Huamark Velodrome in Bangkok and mountain biking was contested in Khao Yai National Park, Nakhon Ratchasima Province.

Schedule

Medalists

Mountain bike

Men

Women

Road

Men

Women

Track

Men

Women

Medal table

References

External links
Results

 
1998
1998 Asian Games events
Asian Games 1998
1998 in road cycling
1998 in track cycling
1998 in mountain biking